Taiping was a 4,324 tons steam ship built by Hong Kong and Whampoa Dock Company, Hong Kong in 1926 for the Australian Oriental Line.

Operational history
Taiping was requisitioned by the Royal Navy as a Victualling Stores Issuing Ship in 1941. She was returned to her owners in 1947.

Fate
Taiping was broken up at Hong Kong in October 1961.

Notes

1926 ships
Ships built in Hong Kong
Stores ships of the Royal Fleet Auxiliary
Ships built by the Hong Kong & Whampoa Dock Company